Takydromus khasiensis (common names: Java grass lizard, Khasi Hills long-tailed lizard ) is a species of lizard. It is found in Northeast India (Assam, Meghalaya), adjacent Myanmar (=Burma), and northern part of Bangladesh. The type locality is the Khasi Hills.

References

Further reading
 Arnold, E. N. 1997 Interrelationships and evolution of the east Asian grass lizards, Takydromus (Squamata: Lacertidae). Zoological Journal of the Linnean Society 119 (2) February, 1997, p 267-296
 Lin, Si-Min; Chaolun Allen Chen and Kuang-Yang Lue 2002 Molecular Phylogeny and Biogeography of the Grass Lizards Genus Takydromus (Reptilia: Lacertidae) of East Asia. Molecular Phylogenetics and Evolution 22: 276-288 [erratum in 26: 333]
 Schlüter, U. 2003 Die Langschwanzeidechsen der Gattung Takydromus. Kirschner & Seufer Verlag, 110 pp. [review in Draco 21: 91]
 Ziegler, Thomas, Wolfgang Böhme and Wolfgang Bischoff. 1999 Comments on the grass lizards (Lacertida, Takydromus) of Vietnam and Myanmar. Hamadryad 24 (1): 39–42.

Takydromus
Reptiles of India
Reptiles of Bangladesh
Reptiles of Myanmar
Reptiles described in 1917
Taxa named by George Albert Boulenger